Domingos André Ribeiro Almeida (born 30 May 2000) is a Portuguese professional footballer who plays as a midfielder for La Liga club Valencia CF.

Club career

Vitória Guimarães
Born in Guimarães, Minho Province, Almeida joined the academy of Vitória S.C. before his 10th birthday. On 6 August 2016, at only 16, he made his senior debut with the reserve side in the LigaPro, playing 77 minutes in a 2–1 away loss against C.D. Santa Clara.

Almeida appeared in his first match in the Primeira Liga with the first team on 18 August 2019, starting in the 1–1 home draw with Boavista FC. He scored his first goal in the competition on 8 September, in the away fixture against Rio Ave FC (same result). The previous March, he had signed a professional contract until 2022 with a buyout clause of €20 million.

Valencia
On 25 August 2022, Almeida joined La Liga club Valencia CF on a six-year deal.

References

External links
Valencia official profile

Portuguese League profile 

2000 births
Living people
Sportspeople from Guimarães
Portuguese footballers
Association football midfielders
Primeira Liga players
Liga Portugal 2 players
Vitória S.C. B players
Vitória S.C. players
La Liga players
Valencia CF players
Portugal youth international footballers
Portugal under-21 international footballers
Portuguese expatriate footballers
Expatriate footballers in Spain
Portuguese expatriate sportspeople in Spain